Clark Township is one of the fourteen townships of Holmes County, Ohio, United States. As of the 2010 census the population of the township was 4,080, up from 3,728 at the 2000 census. As of 2010, 3,936 of the population lived in the unincorporated portion of the township.

Geography
Located in the southeastern corner of the county, it borders the following townships:
Walnut Creek Township - north
Sugar Creek Township, Tuscarawas County - northeast
Auburn Township, Tuscarawas County - east
Bucks Township, Tuscarawas County - southeast
Crawford Township, Coshocton County - south
Mill Creek Township, Coshocton County - southwest corner
Mechanic Township - west
Berlin Township - northwest

Part of the village of Baltic is located in southeastern Clark Township, and the unincorporated communities of Charm, Farmerstown, and Unionville lie in the northwestern, central, and northeastern parts of the township.

Name and history
Statewide, other Clark Townships are located in Brown, Clinton, and Coshocton counties. It was originally named German Township, but its name was changed to Clark Township in the 1910s.

Government
The township is governed by a three-member board of trustees, who are elected in November of odd-numbered years to a four-year term beginning on the following January 1. Two are elected in the year after the presidential election and one is elected in the year before it. There is also an elected township fiscal officer, who serves a four-year term beginning on April 1 of the year after the election, which is held in November of the year before the presidential election. Vacancies in the fiscal officership or on the board of trustees are filled by the remaining trustees.

References

External links
County website

Townships in Holmes County, Ohio
Townships in Ohio